In mathematics, an exact C*-algebra is a C*-algebra that preserves exact sequences under the minimum tensor product.

Definition

A C*-algebra E is exact if, for any short exact sequence,

the sequence

where ⊗min denotes the minimum tensor product, is also exact.

Properties

 Every nuclear C*-algebra is exact.

 Every sub-C*-algebra and every quotient of an exact C*-algebra is exact. An extension of exact C*-algebras is not exact in general.

 It follows that every sub-C*-algebra of a nuclear C*-algebra is exact.

Characterizations

Exact C*-algebras have the following equivalent characterizations:

A C*-algebra A is exact if and only if A is nuclearly embeddable into B(H), the C*-algebra of all bounded operators on a Hilbert space H.

A C*-algebra is exact if and only if every separable sub-C*-algebra is exact.
 
A separable C*-algebra A is exact if and only if it is isomorphic to a subalgebra of the Cuntz algebra .

References

C*-algebras